Grix is a surname. Notable people with this surname include:

 Francis Le Grix White (1819–1887), British vicar and geologist
 Scott Grix (born 1984), Irish rugby league footballer
 Simon Grix (born 1985), Irish rugby league footballer